Joshua Mohr (born July 8, 1976) is an American author.

Biography
Joshua Mohr moved to the Bay Area (from Phoenix, AZ) in 1988, and currently lives in the Mission District of San Francisco, CA. He attended San Francisco State University for his undergraduate studies, where he received two Bachelor of Arts degrees: the first in history, the second in creative writing. He then went on to receive a Master of Fine Arts in creative writing at the University of San Francisco, where he graduated in 2005.

Joshua Mohr teaches creative writing at The Writing Salon in San Francisco and at the University of San Francisco.

Reception
Reception to Mohr's work has been predominantly positive, receiving positive reviews from O Magazine and SF Gate. His novel Termite Parade was listed as an "Editor's Choice" by the New York Times in 2010.

Bibliography

Novels
Some Things that Meant the World to Me (2009)
Termite Parade (2010)
Damascus (2011)
Fight Song: A Novel (2013)
All This Life: A Novel (2015)

Short Stories
Dressing the Dead

Other publications
'Other Voices
Cimarron Review
Gulf Coast
Pleiades

recipes for hemlock (BPM Publishing, 2004), poetry, 55 pages,

References

External links
Official author website
A Faithful Grope in the Dark

1976 births
Living people
Mission District, San Francisco
Writers from San Francisco
University of San Francisco alumni
San Francisco State University alumni
American male writers